Club Me is the second EP released as an extra by the American punk rock band The Offspring on January 1, 1997. It was initially only available to fan club members. Copies of it were sometimes sold from their online store.

Club Me is from the Ixnay on the Hombre (1997) era. The picture on the actual CD is a larger version of one of the pictures on the back of Ixnay on the Hombre. None of the tracks on the EP, however, appear on Ixnay on the Hombre or any other Offspring album. This is unlike the previous EPs released by the Offspring (Baghdad, They Were Born to Kill, and A Piece of Americana), which all contained tracks that appeared on other studio albums.

"Smash It Up" was also released as a single on the Batman Forever soundtrack. "D.U.I." was used in "I Know What You Did Last Summer" soundtrack.

Track listing

See also
"Night of Destruction"
"Machine Gun Etiquette"

References

The Offspring EPs
1997 EPs